Jakub Paur (born 4 July 1992) is a Slovak footballer who plays for Spartak Trnava in the Fortuna Liga as a midfielder.

Club career
He grew up in Višňové, near Žilina. He is a product of the MŠK Žilina youth academy. He spent he first senior years on a season-long loan for more playing time at ViOn Zlaté Moravce. After the loan ended, he returned to Žilina. His two important goals against Slovenian Olimpija Ljubljana arranged promotion to the 3rd round of 2013-14 Europa League season.

International career
Paur was first called up to the senior national team for two unofficial friendly fixtures held in Abu Dhabi, UAE, in January 2017, against Uganda (1–3 loss) and Sweden (0–6 loss). Although it was expected that coach Ján Kozák will field him against Sweden, after Paur did not appear against Uganda, before the match it was publicised that Paur will not play due to a further unspecified injury. Consequently Paur remained the only of the 23 called up players, who did not appear in either of the matches.

Personal life
Paur is married to Romana, who gave birth to his first son, Jakub, who was born August 2021.

External links
 MŠK Žilina profile 
 Corgoň Liga profile
 
 FC ViOn Zlaté Moravce profile

References

External links
 

1992 births
Living people
People from Žilina District
Sportspeople from the Žilina Region
Slovak footballers
Slovakia youth international footballers
Slovakia under-21 international footballers
Association football midfielders
MŠK Žilina players
FC ViOn Zlaté Moravce players
AS Trenčín players
FC Spartak Trnava players
Slovak Super Liga players